Brumbaugh Homestead, also known as the Timothy Meadows Farm, is a historic home located at Penn Township in Huntingdon County, Pennsylvania. It was built in three sections.  The oldest section was built in 1804 and is a two-story, stone building in an early Federal style. A brick addition and vertical plank addition were added to the stone section sometime before the 1860s. The house is believed to have been used for church services for the James Creek Dunker Congression, later Church of the Brethren.

It was listed on the National Register of Historic Places in 1979.

References 

Houses on the National Register of Historic Places in Pennsylvania
Federal architecture in Pennsylvania
Houses completed in 1804
Houses in Huntingdon County, Pennsylvania
National Register of Historic Places in Huntingdon County, Pennsylvania